Keith San Esteban Thompson (born February 15, 1997), better known by his screen name Kit Thompson, is a Filipino-New Zealander actor, model, and television host. He was a housemate in the reality show Pinoy Big Brother: Teen Edition 4 (2012).

Career 

Thompson was a housemate of Pinoy Big Brother: Teen Edition 4 which aired in 2012. In the same year, he was cast as Albert Espirutu in ABS-CBN's Kahit Puso'y Masugatan and appeared in an episode of the drama anthology Maalaala Mo Kaya.

For the Cinemalaya entry #Y, Thompson shared a Special Citation for Ensemble Acting award with actors Chynna Ortaleza, Coleen Garcia, Sophie Albert and Elmo Magalona.

In 2018, Thompson appeared as Darwin in Star Cinema's The Hows of Us. A year later, he appeared as Josh in Belle Douleur, as Marco in the iWant original MOMOL Nights, and as Greco in Sino ang Maysala?: Mea Culpa―for which he was awarded Best Supporting Actor in the 4th GEMS Awards.

In 2020, Thompson appeared as James in Pamilya Ko and in the first season of La Vida Lena.

Legal issues
On March 18, 2022, Thompson was arrested by the Philippine National Police (PNP) after receiving a report that his girlfriend, actress Ana Jalandoni, needed rescuing after allegedly being detained and beaten by Thompson in their hotel room in Tagaytay. The PNP charged Thompson with violating at least two provisions of the Republic Act 9262, or the Anti-Violence Against Women and Their Children law. He posted bail on March 21. The extent of Jalandoni's injuries was published on social media.

Filmography

Television

Film

Awards and nominations

References

External links
 
 

1997 births
Living people
Filipino male models
Filipino male television actors
Filipino male film actors
Filipino people of Scottish descent
Filipino people of New Zealand descent
21st-century Filipino male actors

GMA Network personalities
Participants in Philippine reality television series
Pinoy Big Brother contestants
ABS-CBN personalities
Star Magic